Crab Orchard is an unincorporated census-designated place east of Marion in Williamson County, Illinois, located along an old route of Illinois Route 13 now designated Crab Orchard Road. The upper branches of Crab Orchard Creek which eventually feed into Crab Orchard Lake flow nearby and gave the community its name. For a brief time during the Civil War, it was known as Erwinsville, which is the name in the original plat of the village. In its early days, it had the nickname "Steal-Easy." The Crab Orchard post office was established 18 August 1853 and discontinued operations 15 May 1924. It's now served by the Marion post office. As of the 2010 census, Crab Orchard has a population of 333.

Demographics

Community services
Crab Orchard Community Unit School District 3 serves the community and surrounding area.

The Crab Orchard Public Library District serves the area with its main library in Crab Orchard and satellite services at Pittsburg and Creal Springs.

Fire protection is provided by Williamson County Fire Protection District. Station #3 is located on the north edge of the community. Treated water is provided by the private Coal Valley Water District.

Notable people 

 Cory Bailey, professional baseball player, attended school in Crab Orchard.
 Gerry Glasco, college softball coach at Louisiana and former head coach at the USSSA Pride and the Scrap Yard Dawgs of the National Pro Fastpitch

References

Census-designated places in Williamson County, Illinois
Populated places established in 1853